Bivaran (also Romanized as Bīvarān and Bīwarān; also known as Bayooran) is a village in Aq Kahriz Rural District, Nowbaran District, Saveh County, Markazi Province, Iran. At the 2006 census, its population was 309, in 104 families.

References 

Populated places in Saveh County